Federico Zwanck (born 1 March 1934) is an Argentine former freestyle swimmer. He competed in three events at the 1952 Summer Olympics.

References

External links
 

1934 births
Living people
Argentine male freestyle swimmers
Olympic swimmers of Argentina
Swimmers at the 1952 Summer Olympics
Sportspeople from Córdoba, Argentina
Swimmers at the 1955 Pan American Games
Pan American Games medalists in swimming
Pan American Games silver medalists for Argentina
Medalists at the 1955 Pan American Games